The 2007–08 season covers the period from 1 July 2007 to 30 June 2008. It marks the 125th year of football played by Bristol Rovers F.C. and their 81st season in The Football League. The team plays in Football League One having won the Football League Two playoff game at Wembley Stadium on 26 May 2007, beating Shrewsbury 3–1 in front of a crowd of 61,589.

Chronological list of events
This is a list of the significant events to occur at the club during the 2007–08 season, presented in chronological order. This list does not include transfers, which are listed in the transfers section below, or match results, which are in the results section.
7 July: Aaron Lescott signed a new two-year contract, running until the summer of 2009.
10 July: New contracts were signed by Richard Walker, Lewis Haldane and Chris Carruthers. Haldane signed a three-year contract, Walker a two-year one and Carruthers one-year.
10 August: First-Team Coach Paul Trollope and Director of Football Lennie Lawrence both signed extended contracts with the club. Bill Smith resigned from his position as chief executive to concentrate on his other business commitments.
17 August: A delay in the demolition of the Memorial Stadium was announced, meaning that the club will play the whole season there and not move to Cheltenham in January as had previously been announced.
18 August: Craig Disley signed a one-year contract extension, keeping him at the club until the summer of 2009.
23 August: Goalkeeping coach Steve Book was registered as a player after backup goalie Mike Green broke his finger in a reserve match.
28 August: Rovers' League Cup run came to an end after a 2–1 defeat to Premier League side West Ham. The game was overshadowed by the injury to Kieron Dyer who suffered a suspected broken leg.
4 September: Charlie Clough, who was promoted to the first team squad in the summer, signed his first professional contract on his 17th birthday.
2 October: Edward Ware is appointed to the club's board of directors.
9 October: Rovers' hopes of reaching the Football League Trophy final for the second year running came to an end as they lost their second round tie with AFC Bournemouth 1–0.
15 October: Former Rovers defender Billy Clark was appointed the club's new under-18's coach.
24 November: Both Steve Elliott and Richard Walker received 3 match bans after being handed straight red cards by referee Rob Styles in a bad tempered derby with Swindon Town. Joe Jacobson picked up his fifth yellow card of the season in the same game, resulting in a one match suspension for the Welshman.
22 December: Craig Disley received his fifth yellow card of the season in the match away to Leeds resulting in a one-game suspension.
26 December: Captain Stuart Campbell picked up his fifth yellow card of the season. He was suspended for the FA Cup Third Round tie with Fulham
22 January: Rovers beat Fulham in the 3rd round of the FA cup, after drawing the original match 2:2 they won the replay at The Memorial Stadium on penalties after a 0:0 120 minutes.
16 February: Rovers beat Southampton in the 5th round of the FA cup, courtesy of an 84th-minute strike by Rickie Lambert.
9 March: The club-record-equalling FA Cup run ended at the quarter-final stage, with a defeat to West Bromwich Albion, in front of a Memorial Stadium record crowd for football of 12,011.
3 June: The football club announced that the stadium redevelopment would be postponed for a further year after the initial accommodation providers pulled out and a leak on an unofficial club website caused negotiations with an alternative provider to collapse.

Fixtures and results

Legend

League One

FA Cup

League Cup

Football League Trophy

Squad

|}

Goalscorers

Discipline

Transfers

In
During the 2007–08 season, Rovers signed six new players. Joe Jacobson, David Pipe, Andy Williams, Danny Coles, James Fraser and Jeff Hughes. The total transfer spending for the season is not known, as the Williams and Hughes transfer fees have not been disclosed, however both are known to be "six-figure" sums so the total spending is over £250,000.

Out

In addition to the players listed above, coach Kevin Hodges was released by the club at the end of the season.

Team kit
The team kit for the 2007–08 season is produced by Erreà. The main shirt sponsor is Cowlin Construction and the secondary shirt sponsor is Blackthorn Cider. The home shirt features the traditional blue and white quarters in a darker shade of blue from the previous season, and the away kit is green with black trim.

References

2007-08
2007–08 Football League One by team